Frederick Joseph (Fred) Miller (4 January 19261 May 1992) was an Australian politician and member of the New South Wales Legislative Assembly from 1981 until 1984. He was a member of the Labor Party (ALP).

Miller was born in Surry Hills, in inner Sydney. He was educated at Sydney Technical College and worked as a plumber employed by South Sydney Council and the New South Wales Department of Health. He was a member of the Sydney City Council from 1969 until 1974. Miller was elected to the New South Wales Parliament for the seat of Bligh at the 1981 state election when he defeated the sitting member, John Barraclough, during a landslide win for the Wran Labor Government. He was defeated at the subsequent election in 1984.
He did not hold ministerial or party office.

References

 

1926 births
1992 deaths
Members of the New South Wales Legislative Assembly
Australian Labor Party members of the Parliament of New South Wales
20th-century Australian politicians